The Ferret is a long-running consumer affairs television programme that is broadcast on ITV Cymru Wales. The programme was first broadcast in 1996 on HTV Wales.  It is currently presented by Chris Segar and Hannah Thomas.  Previous presenters include Ruth Wignall, Sarah Hibbard and Juliet Piper.

In 2011 the Ferret held its first Ferret Roadshow, in Pontypridd, to celebrate 15 years of the programme.

References

1996 British television series debuts
1990s Welsh television series
2000s Welsh television series
2010s Welsh television series
ITV (TV network) original programming
British non-fiction television series
Welsh television shows
Television series by ITV Studios
Television shows produced by Harlech Television (HTV)
English-language television shows